USS Condor is a name used more than once by the U.S. Navy:

 , built at Tacoma, Washington, in 1937
 , laid down on 30 September 1942 by the Greenport Basin and Construction Company in Greenport, New York

References 

United States Navy ship names